Fregattenkapitän Heinrich Lehmann-Willenbrock (11 December 1911 – 18 April 1986) was a submarine commander in the Kriegsmarine of Nazi Germany during World War II. He commanded four U-boats, including , a Type VIIC U-boat, which gained widespread recognition when one of its patrols was documented and publicized by an accompanying member of a propaganda company Lothar-Günther Buchheim. Lehmann-Willenbrock was awarded the Knight's Cross of the Iron Cross with Oak Leaves. The story of the U-96 was eventually made into a mini-series and film called Das Boot, in which the captain was portrayed by Jürgen Prochnow.

After the war, Lehmann-Willenbrock became a merchant ship captain, serving as the first captain of Germany's nuclear freighter Otto Hahn.

Early life and career

Lehmann-Willenbrock was born on 11 December 1911 in Bremen, in what was then the German Empire. He joined the Reichsmarine of the Weimar Republic in April 1931, as an Officer Candidate, and received his basic training with the Naval Infantry.  He was promoted to Sea Cadet in October 1931 and attended Navy Officer Training from March 1932 to January 1933.  He was then advanced to the rank of Midshipman and spent the next two years performing at-sea training.  In August 1933, he was also appointed as navigation officer of the naval tender "Weser".  He was advanced to Senior Midshipman in January 1935.

In April 1935, Lehmann-Willenbrock was commissioned as a Leutnant zur See (Lieutenant) and assigned as signals officer onboard the cruiser Karlsruhe.  The following year, in September 1936, he was assigned for five months to the Naval Barracks at Glücksburg before receiving orders to report as Watch officer onboard the sailing vessel Horst Wessel. Lehmann-Willenbrock reported to the ship in February 1937, having received a promotion to Senior Lieutenant one month earlier.  He served on the ship for twenty six months before applying to join the German Navy's submarine branch

U-boat service

Lehmann-Willenbrock transferred to the U-boat arm of the German Navy in April 1939. His first patrol, which lasted 15 days, was along the coast of Norway during Operation Hartmut, the U-boat operation in support of the invasion of Norway.

Upon the return of U-5, Lehmann-Willenbrock was transferred to the newly commissioned , a Type VIIC U-boat. During three patrols under Willenbrock's command, U-96 sank 125,580 tons of Allied shipping. In 1941, U-96 sunk three British troop ships:  (16 January),  (17 January) and Anselm (15 July), each with considerable loss of life. The seventh patrol was the approximate time that Lothar-Günther Buchheim boarded U-96 and documented the boat's operations in his book Das Boot.

Lehmann-Willenbrock left U-96 in March 1942 to be promoted to Korvettenkapitän and appointed commander of the 9th U-boat Flotilla, stationed in Brest. He reached Bergen, Norway, on 23 October. In Bergen he was appointed commander of the 11th U-boat Flotilla in December, and held the position until the German surrender in Norway on 9 May 1945.

During his patrols with U-96, Lehmann-Willenbrock was awarded with the Iron Cross 2nd Class, the Iron Cross 1st Class, the U-Boat War Badge, the Knight's Cross of the Iron Cross, and the Knight's Cross of the Iron Cross with Oak Leaves for his achievements. A total of 1,272 people lost their lives.

Awards

 Wehrmacht Long Service Award 4th Class (2 October 1936)
 Iron Cross (1939) 2nd Class (20 April 1940) & 1st Class (31 December 1940)
 U-boat War Badge (1939) (2 January 1941)
 Italian Croce di Guerra with Swords (1 November 1941)
 Knight's Cross of the Iron Cross with Oak Leaves
 Knight's Cross on 26 February 1941 as Kapitänleutnant and commander of U-96
 Oak Leaves on 31 December 1941 as Kapitänleutnant and commander of U-96
 Wound Badge (1939) in Black (8 May 1942)
 War Merit Cross 2nd Class with Swords (30 January 1944)
 U-boat Front Clasp in Bronze (19 October 1944)
 Cross of the Order of Merit of the Federal Republic of Germany

References

Bibliography

U-boat commanders (Kriegsmarine)
1911 births
1986 deaths
Military personnel from Bremen
Reichsmarine personnel
Recipients of the War Cross for Military Valor
Recipients of the Knight's Cross of the Iron Cross with Oak Leaves
Recipients of the Cross of the Order of Merit of the Federal Republic of Germany